Sarbinowo may refer to the following places in Poland:
Sarbinowo, Gostyń County in Greater Poland Voivodeship (west-central Poland)
Sarbinowo, Poznań County in Greater Poland Voivodeship (west-central Poland)
Sarbinowo, Kuyavian-Pomeranian Voivodeship (north-central Poland)
Sarbinowo, Lubusz Voivodeship (west Poland)
Sarbinowo, Gmina Dębno in West Pomeranian Voivodeship (north-west Poland)
Sarbinowo, Koszalin County in West Pomeranian Voivodeship (north-west Poland), on the Baltic coast